The Mandira Extractive Reserve is an extractive reserve in the state of São Paulo, Brazil. It covers an area of mangroves. The main commercial product extracted by the traditional population is the oyster.

Location

The Mandira Extractive Reserve is in the municipality of Cananéia, São Paulo.
It lies on the coast of the Mar Pequeno, and is partly contained in the Cananéia-Iguape-Peruíbe Environmental Protection Area.
It is bounded to the north and west by the Lagamar de Cananéia State Park.

Environment

The reserve covers an area of estuaries, mangroves, salt marsh and Atlantic forest in the estuarine-lagoon complex of Iguape and Cananéia.

The reserve is in the Atlantic forest domain.
Vegetation is 95% mangroves and 5% litoral forest and salt marshes with shrubby vegetation.
The mangrove vegetation includes Rhizophora mangle, Laguncularia racemosa, Avicennia shaeuriana and Spartina alterniflora.
The narrow strip of land along the border of the reserve contains Calophyllum brasiliense, Rheedia brasiliensis, Syagrus romanzoffiana, Bactris setosa, Ilex thuzans, Dalbergia nigra, Eugenia myrtifolia, Ocotea aciphylla and Chrysophyllum brasiliense.

History

The reserve was created to meet the needs of the traditional quilombo population of the Bairro Mandira lagoon area in Cananéia. 
This population migrated from an economy based mainly on forest extraction and traditional farming to one based on using the lagoon resources for sale, particularly native oysters, but also including crabs, fish and other seafood.
The region is in the Iguape-Cananéia-Paranaguá estuary lagoon complex.

The Mandira Extractive Reserve was created by presidential decree on 13 December 2002.
It is administered by the Chico Mendes Institute for Biodiversity Conservation (ICMBio).
It is classed as IUCN protected area category VI (protected area with sustainable use of natural resources).
An extractive reserve is an area used by traditional extractive populations whose livelihood is based on extraction, subsistence agriculture and small-scale animal raising.
Its basic objectives are to protect the livelihoods and culture of these people and to ensure sustainable use of natural resources.
Implementation of the reserve was a highly positive example of sustainable development.
With greater recognition and help in marketing, the people of the reserve are proud of their environmental conservation work and the quality of their products, and are seen as leaders in the region.

The deliberative council was created on 6 November 2006.
A decree of 19 November 2010 confirmed the right of the traditional extractive communities to use the reserve.
On 22 November 2010 ICMBio granted this right to the reserve's quilombo community association (Associação da Comunidade Remanescente de Quilombo da Reserva Extrativista do Mandira).
The management plan was approved on 25 February 2011.
The beneficiary profile was approved on 28 January 2016.

The reserve is part of the Lagamar mosaic of conservation units of the south coast of São Paulo and the coast of Paraná.

Notes

Sources

Extractive reserves of Brazil
Protected areas of São Paulo (state)
2002 establishments in Brazil